The Alliance for Real Change (ARC) is a Kenyan political party founded in 2010 but registered in 2012, by Mohammed Abduba Dida a candidate in the March 2013 Kenyan Presidential election.

References

2010 establishments in Kenya
Political parties established in 2010
Political parties in Kenya